East Maitland railway station is a heritage-listed railway station located on the Main Northern line in New South Wales, Australia serving East Maitland. It is the fourth site of the station known as East Maitland. It was added to the New South Wales State Heritage Register on 2 April 1999.

History 
The first site to bear the East Maitland name was a temporary terminus while the bridge over Wallis Creek was being built, was about where Victoria Street is now. The second was directly north of William Street between the East Maitland Courthouse and Post Office.

The third site was opened originally as Morpeth Junction when the short Morpeth branch to Morpeth opened in 1866 and was about 400 metres west of the present East Maitland. The second station closed in 1873 and became the goods yard and Morpeth Junction was renamed East Maitland.

The current site was opened in 1914 when the Main Northern line was quadrupled with the two extra coal roads built south side of the existing tracks. At that time the Morpeth branch was realigned to allow trains to proceed directly from Newcastle instead of from Maitland. It received its own platform on a lower level. The new site of East Maitland became the junction and the third East Maitland then became the goods siding. For many years after 1916 there were five tracks from the goods siding to just east of East Maitland station. The remains of this can be seen in the wider than now required overpass of Melbourne Street and in the wider Pitnacree Road bridge over the railway line.
 
The line to Morpeth closed in 1953 with the branch line platform at East Maitland still remaining today.

Platforms and services
East Maitland has one island platform with two faces. It is serviced by NSW TrainLink Hunter Line services travelling between Newcastle, Maitland and Telarah. It is also serviced by one early morning service to Scone.

See also 

List of regional railway stations in New South Wales

References

External links

East Maitland station details Transport for New South Wales

Maitland, New South Wales
Railway stations in the Hunter Region
Railway stations in Australia opened in 1914
Regional railway stations in New South Wales
New South Wales State Heritage Register
Main North railway line, New South Wales